FC Saburtalo is a Georgian football club, based in Tbilisi, the capital of the country.

History
Saburtalo was founded on August 20, 1999 in Tbilisi. In 2005, the club was bought by Iberia Business Group and its owner Tariel Khechikashvili, who later became the Minister of Sport & Youth Affairs of Georgia.

Saburtalo has one of the top football academies in the country. The club has a full-size stadium, called Bendela, with the capacity of 1,800 spectators.

In March 2016, Manolo Hierro was appointed as the sporting director of the club.

Saburtalo is the name of one of Tbilisi's central districts.

Honours

Statistics

Domestic
{|class="wikitable"
|-bgcolor="#efefef"
! Season
! League
! Pos.
! Pl.
! W
! D
! L
! GF
! GA
! P
! Cup
! Europe
! Notes
! Manager
|-
|2013–14
|bgcolor=#ffa07a|Erovnuli Liga 2
|align=right|8
|align=right|26 ||align=right|9 ||align=right|5 ||align=right|12
|align=right|38 ||align=right|34 ||align=right|32
|DNP
|
|
|Temur Shalamberidze
|-
|2014–15
|bgcolor=#ffa07a|Erovnuli Liga 2
|align=right bgcolor=gold|1
|align=right|36 ||align=right|28 ||align=right|3 ||align=right|5
|align=right|92 ||align=right|25 ||align=right|82
|First round
|
|Promoted
|Giorgi Chiabrishvili
|-
|2015–16
|Erovnuli Liga
|align=right|8
|align=right|30 ||align=right|11 ||align=right|6 ||align=right|13
|align=right|47 ||align=right|61 ||align=right|39
|First round
|
|
|Giorgi Chiabrishvili
|-
|2016
|Erovnuli Liga
|align=right|3
|align=right|12 ||align=right|5 ||align=right|4 ||align=right|3
|align=right|17 ||align=right|12 ||align=right|19
|First round
|
|Lost Bronze play-offs to Dinamo Tbilisi
|Pablo Franco
|-
|2017
|Erovnuli Liga
|align=right|4
|align=right|36 ||align=right|18 ||align=right|6 ||align=right|12
|align=right|61 ||align=right|42 ||align=right|60
|Fourth round
|
|
|Giorgi Chiabrishvili
|-
|2018
|Erovnuli Liga
|align=right bgcolor=gold|1
|align=right|36 ||align=right|24 ||align=right|7 ||align=right|5
|align=right|64 ||align=right|29 ||align=right|79
|Third round
|
|
|Giorgi Chiabrishvili
|-
|2019
|Erovnuli Liga
|align=right|3
|align=right|36 ||align=right|21 ||align=right|7 ||align=right|8
|align=right|67 ||align=right|36 ||align=right|70
|style="background-color:#FE2;"| Winners
|Champions League - 2QR  Europa League - 3QR
|
|Giorgi Chiabrishvili
|-
|2020
|Erovnuli Liga
|align=right|5
|align=right|18 ||align=right|7 ||align=right|6 ||align=right|5
|align=right|28 ||align=right|21 ||align=right|27
|Semi-final
|Europa League - 1QR
|
|Teimuraz Shalamberidze,
Levan Korgalidze
|}

European record

As of 14 July 2022

Notes
 QR: Qualifying round

Overall record

Legend: GF = Goals For. GA = Goals Against. GD = Goal Difference.

Players

First team squad

External links
Official website

References

Football clubs in Georgia (country)
Football clubs in Tbilisi
FC Saburtalo Tbilisi
FC Saburtalo Tbilisi